Paschalis Soedita Hardjasoemarta (born 31 March 1929 in Wonosobo – 23 May 1999) was an Indonesian clergyman and bishop for the Roman Catholic Diocese of Purwokerto. He became ordained in 1956. He was appointed bishop in 1973. He died on 23 May 1999, at the age of 70.

References

1929 births
1999 deaths
People from Wonosobo Regency
20th-century Roman Catholic bishops in Indonesia